Harrie van Heumen (born 24 December 1959) is a former ice hockey forward from the Netherlands. He participated in the 1980 Winter Olympics in Lake Placid, New York.

External links

1959 births
Living people
Dutch ice hockey left wingers
's-Hertogenbosch Red Eagles players
Ice hockey players at the 1980 Winter Olympics
IJshockey Club Utrecht players
Nijmegen Tigers players
Olympic ice hockey players of the Netherlands
Sportspeople from Nijmegen
Rotterdam Panda's players